Victor Truhanov (born 30 January 1991 in Tiraspol) is a Moldovan football midfielder who plays for Dinamo-Auto Tiraspol.

Club statistics
Total matches played in Moldovan First League: 119 matches - 15 goal

References

External links
 

1991 births
Living people
Moldovan footballers
Moldovan Super Liga players
FC Sheriff Tiraspol players
FC Tiraspol players
Association football midfielders